Southwest Regional Medical Center was located at I-430 and I-30 in Little Rock, Arkansas, It closed on July 15, 2008.

On August 27, 2008, Baptist Health- Arkansas announced that it had acquired the facility.  Though financial details were not disclosed, Baptist announced that it planned to relocate support and patient-care services to the Southwest Little Rock facility to accommodate more patients at its main campus.

References 

Defunct hospitals in Arkansas
Hospitals disestablished in 2008
Buildings and structures in Little Rock, Arkansas